Unyime Josiah Idem  (born 14 January 1975) is a businessman, politician, philanthropist and honourable member representing Oruk Anam/Ukanafun federal constituency in the Nigeria Federal House of Representatives. He is the Founder of Idems Ultimate Limited- a telecommunication service provider, and Stanford Microfinance Bank Limited  with stakes in several other companies in agricultural sector,  real estate, construction with over five hundred employees. In May 2022, Idem was nominated for second term as PDPD Candidate for Ukanafun/Oruk Anam Federal Constituency Race

Early life and education 
Unyime Josiah Idem was born in Usung Atiat in Ukanafun Local Government in Akwa Ibom State. He attended Western Annang Secondary Commercial School – Wasco, Ikot Akpa Nkuk finishing with Senior School Certificate Examination, SSCE. An alumnus of University of Uyo, he holds a bachelor's degree in business management and a master's degree in business administration. He presently awaits a PhD in Leadership, Monarch Business School, Monarch University, Switzerland. Idem holds several professional certificates in telecommunication and management including Telecoms Customer Service Training, Accra, Ghana; Resource Management Course, Johannesburg, South Africa; Telecoms Customer Service Training, New Delhi, India; Marketing Management Course, Beijing, China; Executive Management Course, Westminster, London; Financial Management Course, Boroughs, London; Public Administration Course, New York, USA; Financial Management and Strategic Management Course, Lagos Business School, Nigeria; Marketing Management Course, New York, USA; and World Telecoms Conference, Abuja, Nigeria.

Idem is a Fellow of Chartered Institute of Commerce of Nigeria, Chartered Institute Of Operations Research Of Nigeria; Chartered Institute Of Management And Public Diplomacy Of Nigeria,  Chartered Institute Of Leadership Of Nigeria, Institute Of Chartered Economists Of Nigeria, Institute Of Management Consultants, Institute Of Corporate Executives Of Nigeria, Institute Of Project Managers Of Nigeria, and Institute Of Corporate Leadership And Mentorship.

Political career 
Idem's political career started in the year 2000 when he was first elected Peoples’ Democratic Party, PDP official in his ward 8 as assistant secretary. In the same year, he was appointed Special Adviser Projects to Ukanafun local council chairman. In 2011, he was appointed into Godswill/Nsima Ekere governorship campaign organisation on the platform of PDP. At the expiration of the tenure of Governor Godswill Akpabio and his deputy Nsima Ekere in 2015, Emmanuel Udom emerged the candidate of the PDP for the 2015 governorship election in Akwa Ibom state, thus forming Udom/Moses Divine Mandate Campaign Organisation. Idem was a member of the campaign organisation. He was a delegate to PDP primaries in 2015.

It must be noted that Unyime Idem’s career path seems to have been inspired by vision combined with determination to make a difference. The innate desire and passion to impact lives, render services, create employment and wealth prompted him to venture into business with a paltry sum of N45,000 and two staffers, the outcome of which gave birth to Idems Group of Companies, a service delivery Conglomerate with special interests in telecommunications, building and construction, real estate, banking, and distribution services.

Election to Federal House of Representatives 
Following his business success in telecommunication, finance and agriculture and his growing popularity and influence, the constituents of Oruk Anam/Ukanafun federal constituency urged him to run for the seat in the Nigeria federal house of representatives. In 2018, he contested for the PDP ticket in the primary election of the party beating three other candidates to emerge PDP flag bearer. In the 23 February 2019 general election he defeated his main challenger Rt. Hon. Emmanuel Ukoette of the All Progressives Congress, APC an incumbent who was running for a return ticket to the green chamber for a third term. Emmanuel Ukoette challenged the election of Idem at the national assembly election petition tribunal alleging wide range of electoral irregularities including over voting. The tribunal dismissed the petition for lack of credible evidence and affirmed the election of Idem. In May 2022, Idem was nominated for second term as PDPD Candidate for Ukanafun/Oruk Anam Federal Constituency Race.

Committee assignments 
Idem holds the deputy chairmanship assignment on the House committee on Communications.

2.   Chairman Ad-hoc Committee to investigate non implementation of Pay as you go tariff by DSTV and other satellite broadcast service providers in Nigeria.

3.    Chairman Ad-hoc Committee investigating unclaimed Federal Government Funds in Commercial Banks and infractions by the Central Bank of Nigeria

4.   Member Conference Committee to harmonise Electoral Act Amendment Bill, 2022 representing South-South Region.

5.   Member Ad-hoc committee that investigated the Bauchi State House of Assembly crisis,

6.   Member Ad-hoc committee on water resources

7.   Member Ad-hoc committee to investigate NDDC Interim Management Committee

8.   Delegate to International Telecoms Conference that took place in Hungary

9.   Member Committees on ICT, NDDC, Petroleum Resources (Upstream), Works, Nigeria Contents Development and Monitoring Board, Public Procurement, Banking and Currency, Civil Societies and Development Partners, SDGs, Customs and Excise.

Bills and Motions 
In July 2019, Idem at a plenary sitting of the federal house of representatives moved a motion calling for the rehabilitation of the 72-year old Nigeria Institute for Palm Oil Research- NIFOR, Oruk Anam sub-station, Akwa Ibom state. He told the house that the  research institute had been neglected for decades and the staff there were on monthly salary of 4,000 naira (US$11).

His motion argued that rehabilitation of NIFOR would guarantee food security, create jobs, generate foreign exchange and raw materials for Nigeria. NIFOR was one of the institutes where Malaysian researchers collected palm seedling for the development of their country's palm oil. The house consequently approved rehabilitation of the institute.

SOME OF THE MOTIONS SPONSORED 

1.   Need for the Federal government to revamp the ailing Nigerian Institute for Oil Palm Research, NIFOR, located at Oruk Anam LGA, 

2.   the need for the federal government to construct the highway linking Abak Midim and Mkpat Enin LGA as well as the construction of Ikot Ukpong-Eren bridge in Oruk Anam that collapsed 40 years ago,

3.   Need to investigate non-implementation of pay as you go (PAYG) tariff by DSTV and other broadcast satellite service providers in Nigeria,

4.   the need for the federal government to increase security presence in federal roads during festive seasons,

5.   urgent need for the Federal Government to appoint 37 Commissioners into Federal Character Commission,

6.   the need for emergency national response to tackle the coronavirus pandemic presently ravaging the human race,

7.   Urgent need to create immediate public awareness and preparedness to combat possible outbreak of Ebola virus and to take measures to avoid same

8.    the need for the federal government to suspend the implementation of the 2.5 percent VAT increment and revert to the original 5 percent until January 1, 2021 in the interest of Nigerians during this period of covid-19 pandemic,

9.   a call on the Federal Government to immediately set up Sex Offender and Gender Violation Special Court for speedy trial of the Perpetrators of the offence,

10.       a call on the Federal Government to immediately establish and inaugurate the National Council on Public Procurement to strengthen the fight against corruption in the Public Sector

11.       Non-Release of Traditional Take-Off Grant to University of Uyo, Akwa Ibom State and other Notable Federal Universities Across the Country after their Establishment.

12.       A call for comprehensive investigation, prosecution and punishment of the perpetrators of the kidnapping, sexual assault, physical assault and heinous killing of Miss Iniubong Umoren and the need to protect her family members

13.       Urgent call on the Service chiefs and the Inspector General of Police to intensify efforts in the rescue of the abducted school children and staff of Government Secondary School, Kagara Niger State

14.       Need for the Federal Government to establish Clay Processing Factory in Oruk Anam Local Government of Akwa Ibom State.

15.       Need for the Federal Government to address Constitutional Infraction against Federal Character Principle in the appointment of Heads of MDAs

16.       Need to clamp down on the activities of illegal refineries operators in the Niger Delta of the country 

BILL SPONSORED

1.   The Free internet access in public places Bill 2020; 

2.   National Broadcasting Commission Act (amendment) Bill 2020;

3.   National Community Service Scheme Bill 2020;

4.   Entrepreneurship Education Bill 2020;

5.   Small and Medium Scale Entrepreneurship Development Agency Act (amendment) Bill 2020,

6.   Free Education (Prohibition of Fees and Other Charges) Bill, 2020.

7.   Federal College of Agriculture, Oruk Anam (Establishment) Bill, 2020;

8.   Adult Education (Establishment) Bill, 2020

9.   National Identity Management Commission (Amendment) Bill, 2020

10.    National Open University (Amendment) Bill, 2020.

11.    National Information Technology Development Agency Act Amendment Bill. 2021

12.    Terrorism (Prevention) Act Amendment Bill 2021

13.    Nigeria Police Act Amendment Bill 2021

14.    Nigeria Communications Act Amendment Bill 2021

15.     Donor Agencies Regulatory Commission (Establishment) Bill, 2021

16.    Federal Character Commission Act (Amendment) Bill 2021

17.    Federal Service Act (Amendment) Bill, 2021

Constituency project 
In his years in business, Idem was known for human capital development.  During his election campaign he promised his constituents that if elected he would focus his constituency project on developing the young people in various skills that would help them set up businesses or find jobs. In August 2019, Idem launched his first constituency project to train about five thousand youths in various skills of their choices. The skill acquisition program would help the youths to be economically independent, take them off the street, reduces youth restiveness and restore social order in Oruk Anam/Ukanafun federal constituency.

So far, Unyime Idem has sponsored over 40 life touching projects including  1000-Seater Capacity State of the Art Vocational Skills Centre, Ukanafun LGA, 1000-Seater Capacity State of the Art Vocational Skills Centre, Oruk Anam LGA, 1000-Seater Capacity State of the Art Agricultural Skills Acquisition Centre, Entrepreneurial Skills Centre, Ukanafun LGA, Digital E-Learning Centre with 40 Computer Sets and solar electricity at Community High School, Usung Atiat, Ukanafun LGA; Digital E-Learning Centre with 40 computer Sets and solar electricity at Afaha High School, Ikot Udombang, Ukanafun LGA; ICT Learning Centre with 40 Computer Sets and solar electricity at Community Secondary School, Urua Ekpaenang, Ukanafun LGA; Digital E-Learning Centre with 40 computer Sets, solar panel and 20KVA generator at Community Secondary School, Mbiakot Oruk Anam LGA; Donated more than 50,000 text/note books, writing and other teaching    materials to schools in the two local governments of Ukanafun and Oruk       Anam, to boost teaching and learning and Empowered 1000 Constituents in 26 different skills. He has also constructed Lecture Hall in Akwa Ibom State University, Obio Okpa Campus, Oruk Anam LGA, Six Classroom Block Lecture Hall at Maurid Polytechnic, Mbaiso, Nsit Ibom LGA, Learning Centre with 40 Computer Sets and solar electricity at Community Secondary School, Ikot Esenam, Oruk Anam LGA, ICT Learning Centre with 50 Computer Sets in Akwa Ibom State University, Obio Okpa Campus, Oruk Anam LGA

Given his performance, Hon. Unyime Idem has been unanimously endorsed by his people and elected by the PDPD delegates to return for a second term at the House of Representatives  

HONOURS AND AWARDS

·        Best Federal Lawmaker on Constituency Development by Nigerian Union of Journalist 2022

·        Daily Independent Federal Lawmaker of the Year, Akwa Ibom State 2021

·        Daily Independent Federal Lawmaker of the Year, South-South in Nation Building 2021

·        Public Service Fellowship Award by Maurid Polytechnic 2022

·        Most Outstanding Lawmaker on Constituency Development & Apostle of Motions, 2020 by House of Representatives Press Corps

·        Lawmaker of the Year South-South, 2020 by Elite Exclusive Magazine

·        Outstanding Leadership Award 2020 by Niger Delta Students Union Government

·        Best Lawmaker in the History of Ukanafun/Oruk Anam Federal Constituency by Lions Club

·        Most Constituency Impactful Lawmaker in South South, 2020 by Niger Delta House of Dream Parliament (NDHODP)

·        National Merit Award for Change and Good Governance by Independent Magazine Publishers Association of Nigeria

·        Best MTN Trade Partner in Nigeria for 2013, 2014 and 2015,

·        Best Airtel Channel Partner in Nigeria for 2013, 2014, 2015 and 2016,

·        Best Entrepreneurial Award by PANACHE, London, UK.

·        Selfless Service Award by Foundation for Peace, Economic and Agricultural Transformation,

·        Idorenyin (Hope) of Ukanafun Excellence Award by Ukanafun Local Government Council

·        Idorenyin (Hope) of Oruk Anam Excellence Award by Oruk Anam Traditional Rulers Council

·        National Merit Award for Change and Good Governance by Independent Magazine Publishers Association of Nigeria

·        Distinguished Business Leader Award by Chartered Institute of Leadership,

·        Akwa Ibom Federal Legislator of the Year Award, by Nigerian Union of Journalists,

·        Award for Effective Representation and Service to Humanity by NUJ AKBC TV Chapel,

·       Merit Award by Akwa Ibom Elderly Citizens Assembly 2018,

·       Outstanding Entrepreneur of the Year 2017 by Arise O Nigeria,

·       Award of Excellence by Nigeria Society of Engineers 2017,

·       Leadership Merit Award by Afe Mkparawa Annang 2017,

·       Distinguished Business Leader Award by Chartered Institute of Leadership 2017,

·       Bold Service Award for Telecoms Services by Rotary Club of Uyo 2013,

·       Best Performing GLOBACOM Partner South-South Nigeria 2014.

·       Heroes Award by Etisalat Nigeria 2013,

·       Productivity Merit Award by Akwa Ibom State Government 2013,

·       Instrumentum Commemorationis in recognition of his Service to God and Humanity by Christ the King Cathedral 2014,

·       Entrepreneurs Enterprise Award for Business Excellence by Virtual Developers 2013,

·       International Excellence Award by Bible University 2013,

·       Role Model in Entrepreneurship Award for Private Sector Economy Development and Poverty Eradication by Millennium Achievers Gold Award,

·       Distinguished Entrepreneurial Award by Business Standard Magazine 2009,

·       Life Time Achievement Award by World Peace Prayer Society 2013,

·       Police Community Relations Committee Honorary Award

·        Honorary Member of PCRC Akwa Ibom State Police Command, 2013

His life is guided by the notion that “Only a life lived for service of others is a life well lived; and the ultimate test of man’s conscience is his willingness to sacrifice something today for the future generation whose words of thanks will not be heard.”.  He is a devout Christian, an ordained Pastor of the Living Faith Church (Winners Chapel) who is committed to serving God and propagating the gospel of Christ through evangelism.

References 

1975 births
Living people
Nigerian chief executives
University of Uyo alumni
Nigerian politicians